Budha Nullah or Budha Naala is a seasonal water stream, which runs through the Malwa region of Punjab, India, and after passing through highly populated Ludhiana district, Punjab, India, it drains into Sutlej River, a tributary of the Indus river. Today, it has also become a major source of pollution in the region as well the main Sutlej river, as it gets polluted after entering the highly populated and industrialized Ludhiana city, turning it into an open drain. Also, since large area in south-western Punjab solely depend on the canal water for irrigation, and water from Budha Nullah enters various canals after Harike waterworks near Firozpur, thus affecting far-reaching areas such as Malout, Zira, upper Lambi, while the areas being fed by Sirhind feeder, are the most-affected by its pollution.

In 2006, a Ludhiana-based human rights organisation, filed a case regarding the state of this nullah in the Punjab State Human Rights Commission (PSHRC) and even invited environmentalist, Balbir Singh Seechewal, who had earlier cleaned the 164-km-long highly polluted Kali Bein rivulet with the help of his followers and without the government aid, to take the cause of cleaning up the nullah. 

A study conducted by Punjab Agricultural University in 2008, revealed presence of toxins and heavy metals in the food chain due to use of its water, to cultivate vegetables and other crops. 

This was followed by another study by the School of Public Health, Department of Community Medicine, PGIMER, Chandigarh, and the Punjab Pollution Control Board (PPCB), which also showed heptachlor, beta-endosulphan and chlorpyrifos pesticides in concentrations exceeding the maximum residue limit in samples of ground and canal water used for drinking, the pesticides were also detected in fodder, vegetables, blood, bovine and human milk samples, indicating that these have entered the food chain due to the use of agricultural run-off and irrigation of field with drain water. With increasing poisoning of the soil, the region once hailed as the home to the Green Revolution, now due to excessive use of chemical fertilizer, is being termed the "Other Bhopal", and "even credit-takers of the Revolution have begun to admit they had been wrong, now that they see wastelands and lives lost to farmer suicides in this "granary of India".

Geology
Budha Nullah, literally means Old rivulet or watercourse. It originates at village Koom Kalan of Ludhiana and it runs parallel to the Satluj on its south for a fairly large section of its course in the Ludhiana district and ultimately joins the Satluj at Walipur Kalan in the northwestern corner of the district. Cities of Ludhiana and Machhiwara are situated to the south of the Buddha Nala.

Pollution

The water of the stream is polluted after it enters Ludhiana City. Budha Nullah used to be a fresh water channel with about 56 types of fish species prior to 1964. Now it has no fish because of the high level toxicity in the water. It is now an open sewer rather than a stream. Once an asset to the city, this Nullah is now a source of public nuisance and possess a serious health hazard.

The megacity has no sewage treatment plant and untreated domestic and industrial sewerage of the city is emptied into Budha Nullah. The nullah, in turn, empties into the mighty Sutlej flowing nearby. Hundreds of tonnes of raw sewage from Ludhiana flows into the Sutlej every day and is distributed all over the state through irrigation canals. This polluted water is in turn used for growing food crops, vegetables and fruits and is a known carrier of diseases. According to the State Department of Fisheries the pollution of the Buddha Nullah has led to the drastic reduction in the fish yield in river Sutlej.

A joint study by PGIMER and Punjab Pollution Control Board in 2008, revealed that in villages along the Nullah, calcium, magnesium, fluoride, mercury, beta-endosulphan and heptachlor were more than permissible limit (MPL) in ground and tap waters. Plus the water had high concentration of COD and BOD (chemical and biochemical oxygen demand), ammonia, phosphate, chloride, chromium, arsenic and chlorpyrifos. The ground water also contains nickel and selenium, while the tap water has high concentration of lead, nickel and cadmium.

In 2010, water samples taken from the Nullah, showed heavy metal content as quite high and the presence of uranium 1½ times the reference range. For example, chromium was 50 times the reference range, aluminum and iron 20 and 60 times higher, while concentration of silver, manganese, nickel and lead was equally high.
Presently, sewage treatment plants of 466 MLD (48 MLD at Jamalpur, 111 & 50 MLD at Bhattian and 152 & 105MLD at Balloke) are operational for the treatment of the sewage of Ludhiana city.

Response
In June 2009, Ludhiana district administration imposed article 144 around the nullah, banning the throwing of garbage in it, but in the following months it was scarcely implemented, despite public outcry. In the following month, the Government of Punjab, allocated Rs. 500 million for the cleaning up of the nullah., and in August, the municipal corporation in a demolition drive, removed a large number of illegal encroachments from both sides of the nullah.

On 4 April 2011 Indian Ministry for Environment and Forests has decided to launch "In Situ Bio-Remediation Project" on Buddha Nullah in Ludhiana.

See also
Water pollution in India

References

External links
Wikimapia Link
Map of Buddha Nala

Ludhiana district
Canals in Punjab, India
Indus basin